The 1830 United Kingdom general election was triggered by the death of King George IV and produced the first parliament of the reign of his successor, King William IV. Fought in the aftermath of the Swing Riots, it saw electoral reform become a major election issue.  Polling took place in July and August and the Tories won a plurality over the Whigs, but division among Tory MPs allowed Earl Grey to form an effective government and take the question of electoral reform to the country the following year.

The eighth United Kingdom Parliament was dissolved on 24 July 1830. The new Parliament was summoned to meet on 14 September 1830, for a maximum seven-year term from that date. The maximum term could be and normally was curtailed, by the monarch dissolving the Parliament, before its term expired. This election was the first since 1708 to cause the collapse of the government.

Political situation
The Tory leader, at the time of the 1830 election, was the Duke of Wellington. He had been Prime Minister since 1828.

The previous Parliament had been unstable, with both principal parties fractured. During the 1826–30 Parliament, there had been four Tory prime ministers. The Earl of Liverpool, who had been Prime Minister since 1812, was forced by ill health to retire in 1827.

George Canning, who had been Leader of the House of Commons under Liverpool, became Prime Minister in early 1827. The High Tories, led by the Duke of Wellington and Robert Peel, refused to serve in his government. Canning invited a section of the Whigs, including Lansdowne to join a coalition ministry with the Canningite faction of the Tories. Other Whigs, like Earl Grey, remained in opposition. Some Whigs like Viscount Althorp adopted a neutral attitude to the government.

After Canning's death in August 1827, the premiership passed to Viscount Goderich for a few more months, until Wellington took over on 22 January 1828. Those Whigs who had been in both Canning's and Goderich's governments returned to the Opposition. For a short while a band of MPs and peers who had been supporters of Canning (hence the Canningites) were in included in Wellington's government but left on the issue of the re-distribution of seats from the corrupt parliamentary borough of East Retford in May 1828.

There was a further split in the Tory administration in 1829 on the issue of Catholic emancipation when Daniel O'Connell and his Catholic Association won a parliamentary seat. O'Connell was legally barred from taking his seat in the House of Commons because he was a Catholic, so Wellington's government was forced to bring about a change but that led to another split in their party — this time with the creation of the 'Ultra-Tory' group led by Edward Knatchbull MP and supported by a number of influential peers in the House of Lords.

There had not been a predominantly Whig administration since the Ministry of all the Talents in 1806–07. The Whig Party had had weak leadership, particularly in the House of Commons, for many years. However, during the 1826–30 Parliament the situation improved.

At the time of the general election, the Earl Grey was the leading figure amongst the Whig peers. However Grey had given up the formal leadership in 1824. The Marquess of Lansdowne was acting as leader, but had not taken up the title. The animosity which King George IV had to Earl Grey had barred him from government, but in the new reign his chances of office had improved.

There had been no official Leader of the Opposition in the House of Commons since 1821, but in 1830 the Whigs selected Viscount Althorp to fill the vacancy.

In Irish politics, Daniel O'Connell and his Catholic Association had succeeded in obtaining Catholic emancipation in 1829. However this measure was accompanied with an increase in the property qualification for Irish county voters, from a £2 freehold to a £20 one. For the first time since the penal laws were enacted in the seventeenth century Catholics in Ireland could serve in Parliament. With emancipation achieved, O'Connell was free to pursue his other aim with a campaign for repeal of the Act of Union.

Dates of election
At this period there was not one election day. After receiving a writ (a royal command) for the election to be held, the local returning officer fixed the election timetable for the particular constituency or constituencies he was concerned with. Polling in seats with contested elections could continue for many days.

The general election took place between the first contest on 29 July and the last contest on 1 September 1830.

Summary of the constituencies

Monmouthshire  (1 County constituency with 2 MPs and one single member Borough constituency) is included in Wales in these tables. Sources for this period may include the county in England.

Table 1: Constituencies and MPs, by type and country

Table 2: Number of seats per constituency, by type and country

See also
United Kingdom general elections
List of MPs elected in the 1830 United Kingdom general election
List of MPs elected in the 1832 United Kingdom general election

References

Sources
 British Electoral Facts 1832–1999, compiled and edited by Colin Rallings and Michael Thrasher (Ashgate Publishing Ltd 2000). Source: Dates of Elections – Footnote to Table 5.02
 British Historical Facts 1760–1830, by Chris Cook and John Stevenson (The Macmillan Press 1980). Source: Types of constituencies – Great Britain
 His Majesty's Opposition 1714–1830, by Archibald S. Foord (Oxford University Press 1964)
 Parliamentary Election Results in Ireland 1801–1922, edited by B.M. Walker (Royal Irish Academy 1978). Source: Types of constituencies – Ireland

 
1830 elections in the United Kingdom
General election
1830
1830s elections in Ireland